The Flushing Armory is a historic National Guard armory building located in Flushing, Queens. New York City.  It is a brick and stone castle-like structure built in 1905–1906, designed to be reminiscent of medieval military structures in Europe. It was designed by state architect George L. Heins.

Both sections are built of load bearing brick walls sitting on a brownstone foundation. The building features a five-story octagonal tower at the northwest corner and a three-story round tower at the northeast corner. They feature tall, narrow windows and crenellated parapets. Throughout the armory's history it has been used for the National Guard, as a homeless shelter, and a gymnastics center. It is currently used by the New York City Police Department's Strategic Response Group.

It was listed on the National Register of Historic Places in 1995.

See also
 List of armories and arsenals in New York City and surrounding counties

References

Military facilities on the National Register of Historic Places in New York City
Infrastructure completed in 1906
Armories in New York City
Buildings and structures in Queens, New York
Flushing, Queens
National Register of Historic Places in Queens, New York
1906 establishments in New York City